Amir Mehdizadeh (also Romanized as "Amīr Mehdīzādeh"; born 22 September 1989) is an Iranian karateka. Mehdizadeh competed at the 2014 Asian Games at the 60 kg division and won the gold medal. He also won the gold medal in 2012 and 2016 World Karate Championships.

References

External links 
 Amir Mehdizadeh at KarateRec.com
 

1989 births
People from Qom
Living people
Iranian male karateka
Asian Games gold medalists for Iran
Asian Games silver medalists for Iran
Asian Games medalists in karate
Karateka at the 2010 Asian Games
Karateka at the 2014 Asian Games
Karateka at the 2018 Asian Games
Medalists at the 2014 Asian Games
Medalists at the 2018 Asian Games
World Games silver medalists
Competitors at the 2017 World Games
World Games medalists in karate
Islamic Solidarity Games medalists in karate
Islamic Solidarity Games competitors for Iran
20th-century Iranian people
21st-century Iranian people